Navya Nair is an Indian actress who has appeared predominantly in Malayalam films.

Personal life 

Nair married Santhosh Menon, a Mumbai settled malayali in 2010, and the couple have a son. Famous Malayalm film Director K. Madhu is her Maternal Uncle.

Film career  

Navya Nair started  with Ishtam in 2001 and later acted in the 2002 Malayalam film, Nandanam.

After marriage Nair made a come back television programs.

Filmography

References

External links 

 

Living people
Indian film actresses
Actresses in Kannada cinema
Actresses in Tamil cinema
Kerala State Film Award winners
Actresses from Kerala
Actresses in Malayalam cinema
People from Alappuzha district
Filmfare Awards South winners
Recipients of the Kalaimamani Award
21st-century Indian actresses
Year of birth missing (living people)